The Legion Thoria, also known as the Elejan El-Thoria, were reported to be an element of Muammar Gaddafi's secret police.

In September 2011, in the Battle of Bani Walid during the Libyan Civil War, members of the Legion Thoria were reported to be part of the pro-Gaddafi defending force in the Battle of Bani Walid.

References 

History of Libya under Muammar Gaddafi
First Libyan Civil War
2011 disestablishments in Libya